Umaima Abdullah al-Khamis (Arabic:أميمة الخميس) (born 1966) is a Saudi Arabian writer and novelist. She was born in Riyadh and studied Arabic literature at King Saud University. She works in the Saudi civil service.

Al-Khamis has published a number of books, including short story collections, children's books and novels. Her two novels to date are: Sailors and The Leafy Tree. The latter was longlisted for the 2010 Arabic Booker Prize.

Works
 Sailors
 The Leafy Tree
 The Book Smuggler 2021

References

1966 births
People from Riyadh
Saudi Arabian novelists
King Saud University alumni
Living people
Women novelists
21st-century Saudi Arabian writers
21st-century Saudi Arabian women writers